Ebony O'Dea (born 15 November 1998) is an Australian rules footballer who played for Collingwood in the AFL Women's (AFLW). She was drafted by Greater Western Sydney in the 2018 national draft. Delisted after one season, she was re-drafted by Collingwood in the 2019 national draft and made her professional debut in round 2 of the 2020 season.

Personal life
O'Dea grew up in Springton, South Australia. In Year 12 she studied chemistry the University of Adelaide, travelling in from her town, and started playing football there. She played a key role, helping the university reach the SAWFL Grand Final. As well as football, she is accomplished at unicycling, holding the World Record in Unicycling for "Platform Long Jump" and the Australian women's record for "Platform High Jump".

State football
O'Dea played for South Australian National Football League club Norwood under coach Stephen Symonds. With Norwood she won the premiership in the 2017 season and was named amongst the best players in the 2018 Grand Final.

AFL Women's career

Greater Western Sydney
O'Dea was drafted by Greater Western Sydney with pick 71. At the end of the season she was delisted after not making an appearance for the club. After her delisting she was selected for Greater Western Sydney's inaugural VFL Women's squad, together with five more recently delisted players, so as to strengthen their chances to be re-drafted. This squad played only invitational games not counted for points or ladder position during teams' bye rounds.

Collingwood
The following season O'Dea was drafted by Collingwood with pick 89, re-joining coach Symonds who was her coach when she played at Norwood. She made her debut in round 2, 2020, in a match at Ikon Park against Carlton. In May 2022, she left Collingwood to return to her home state, South Australia.

Statistics
Statistics are correct to the end of the 2022 season.

|- style="background-color: #eaeaea"
! scope="row" style="text-align:center" | 2019
|style="text-align:center;"|
| 20 || 0 || — || — || — || — || — || — || — || — || — || — || — || — || — || —
|- 
! scope="row" style="text-align:center" | 2020
|style="text-align:center;"|
| 50 || 4 || 0 || 0 || 7 || 16 || 23 || 0 || 24 || 0.0 || 0.0 || 1.8 || 4.0 || 5.8 || 0.0 || 6.0
|- style="background-color: #eaeaea"
! scope="row" style="text-align:center" | 2021
|style="text-align:center;"|
| 50 || 10 || 0 || 0 || 29 || 48 || 77 || 9 || 26 || 0.0 || 0.0 || 2.9 || 4.8 || 7.7 || 0.9 || 2.6
|- 
! scope="row" style="text-align:center" | 2022
|style="text-align:center;"|
| 50 || 7 || 1 || 0 || 22 || 30 || 52 || 5 || 17 || 0.1 || 0.0 || 3.1 || 4.3 || 7.4 || 0.7 || 2.4
|- class="sortbottom"
! colspan=3| Career
! 21
! 1
! 0
! 58
! 94
! 152
! 14
! 67
! 0.1
! 0.0
! 2.8
! 4.5
! 7.2
! 0.7
! 3.2
|}

References

External links

 

Living people
1998 births
Collingwood Football Club (AFLW) players
Australian rules footballers from South Australia
Sportswomen from South Australia